Volodymyr II Yaroslavych (?–1198/1199) was a Rus’ prince (a member of the Rurik dynasty). He was prince of Halych (1187–1189, 1189–1198/99).

He was profligate by nature. He lived a debauched life and was politically ineffectual. Due to the strife between Vladimir and his stepbrother, Oleg Yaroslavich and to the interference of Prince Roman the Great and King Béla III of Hungary, his reign in Halych was characterized by troubles. Only the protection that his uncle, Prince Vsevolod III Yuryevich of Vladimir gave him ensured political stability in Halych.

Volodymyr was the last male descendant of the first dynasty ruling in Halych; and therefore his death created a political vacuum.

Early life 
Vladimir was the sole legitimate son of Prince Yaroslav Volodimerovich Osmomysl of Halych by his wife, Olga Yuryevna, a daughter of Grand Prince Yuri I Vladimirovich Dolgoruki of Kiev. In 1166, his father brought Boleslava Siyatoslavna, a daughter of Prince Sviatoslav III Vsevolodovich of Chernigov, as wife for Volodymyr.

However, his father left his mother in 1172, and took a boyar's daughter, Nastaska, as his mistress. Vladimir and his mother fled to Poland. But the boyars rebelled and forced his father to reinstate his mother, and had Nataska burned as a witch. The boyars also placed Oleg Yaroslavich (Vladimir's illegitimate brother by Nataska who was their father's favorite son) under lock and key. They also made Yaroslav Volodimerovich promise to treat his wife with due respect and persuaded Olga Yuryevna and Vladimir to return.

In 1173, Vladimir took his mother and his wife and fled from his father. They went to Prince Yaroslav II Izyaslavich of Lutsk, but Yaroslav Volodimerovich threatened to attack Yaroslav Izyaslavich if the latter did not evict his son. Yaroslav Izyaslavich therefore sent Vladimir and his family to Prince Mikhalko Yuryevich of Torchesk (who was Olga Yuryevna's brother, and thus Vladimir's maternal uncle) . Son after Svyatoslav III Vsevolodovich (Vladimir's father-in-law) invited them to Chernigov (Chernihiv, Ukraine) with the intention of sending them to Prince Andrey Yuryevich Bogolyubsky of Vladimir (who was also Vladimir's maternal uncle); but he did not.

Shortly afterwards, the Rostislavichi (the princes of Smolensk), who had seized Kiev and taken Grand Princes Vsevolod III Yuryevich and Yaropolk Rostislavich of Kiev (Andrey Bogolyubsky's brother and nephew respectively), promised to release the two grand princes if Svyatoslav III Vsevolodovich would hand over to them Vladimir whom they would return to Yaroslav Volodimerovich (his father) in Halych.

In 1184, Vladimir was again driven out of Halych by his father; he was harbored by his brother-in-law, Prince Igor Svyatoslavich of Putivl who ignored the threat of Yaroslav Volodimerovich's reprisals. Vladimir was reconciled with his father in 1186 by Igor Svyatoslavich; Igor Svytoslavich dispatched his own son, Svyatoslav Igorevich to escort Vladimir home.

On October 1, 1187 Yaroslav Volodimerovich died. His last wishes were to grant his illegitimate son, Oleg Yaroslavich the rule of Halych, and Peremishl to Vladimir. The Galicians, however, deposed Oleg Yaroslavich forcing him to seek help from Ryurik Rostislavich in Vruchiy.

Struggle for Halych 
Vladimir lived a dissolute life: he drank to excess, ignored his counselors, forced himself on men's wives and daughters, and took to himself a priest’s wife with whom he had two sons. Prince Roman Mstislavich of Vladimir-in-Volhynia, whose daughter was married to Vladimir's elder son, urged the Galicians to evict Vladimir and make him prince. But they failed either to expel Vladimir or to kill him. When, however, they threatened to kill his wife, Vladimir took her, his two sons and his druzhina and fled to King Béla III of Hungary. A late chronicle reports that Vladimir was defeated by his stepbrother, Oleg Yaroslavich and his ally, Duke Casimir II of Poland (1177–1194). The townsmen, however, poisoned Oleg Yaroslavich and invited Roman Mstislavich to be their prince.

King Béla III marched against Roman Mstislavich intending to reinstate Vladimir, and Roman Mstislavich fled to his patrimony. But King Béla III sent a message to Grand Prince Svyatoslav III Vsevolodovich of Kiev (Vladimir's former father-in-law) inviting him to send his son. Svyatoslav III Vsevolodovich, hoping the king would give his son Halych, dispatched Gleb Svyatoslavich. Later Svyatoslav III Vsevolodovich agreed to attack the Hungarians together with his co-ruler Ryurik Rostislavich; Svyatoslav III Vsevolodovich even wanted Ryurik Rostislavich to take all of Halych and in exchange to hand over the Kievan lands to him.

Meanwhile, however, King Béla III, instead of handing over Halych to Vladimir as he had promised, gave it to his son Andrew. Vladimir and his wife were taken back to Hungary where they were incarcerated. At first Andrew tried to win the loyalty of his new subjects. However, after the attempt of a second cousin of Vladimir (Rostislav Ivanovich) to enter Halych the tenor of Hungarian rule changed for the worse: the Hungarians abused local women and stable their horses in Orthodox churches.
In 1189, Vladimir escaped from the Hungarians. He fled to Germany, asking Emperor Frederick Barbarossa for protection. Vladimir promised the emperor to pay him an annual tribute of 2,000 grivna if he were reinstated by the emperor's help on the Galician throne. The emperor recommended Vladimir to Duke Casimir II of Poland, who sent Polish troops to Halych to support the exile's claim. When Vladimir arrived in Halych, the boyars welcomed him and drove out Prince Andrew.

Prince of Halych 
After occupying Halych in the early part of August, Vladimir requested his uncle Vsevolod III Yuryevich of Vladimir in Suzdalia to support his rule and, in return, promised to be Vsevolod Yuryevich's loyal vassal. He wrote to Vsevolod III Yuryevich: “My father and lord, help me to keep Galicia, and I shall be God’s and thine with all Galicia, always obedient to thy will.” Vsevolod III Yuryevich therefore demanded that all the princes pledge not to challenge Vladimir.

In the autumn of 1196, Grand Prince Ryurik Rostislavich of Kiev sent his nephew Prince Mstislav Mstislavich of Trepol to Vladimir instructing him to join Mstislav Mstislavich in attacking the lands of Prince Roman Mstislavich of Vladimir-in-Volhynia who had attacked the domains of Ryurik Rostislavich's brother (Prince David Rostislavich of Smolensk) and son (Prince Rostislav Rurikovich of Torchesk). Accordingly, Vladimir and Mstislav Mstislavich razed Roman Mstislavich's district around Peremil.

Vladimir died in 1198 or 1199; with his death, the dynasty of Halych became defunct.

Marriages and children 

#1 (1166): Boleslava Svyatoslavna (?-before 1189), a daughter of Prince Svyatoslav III Vsevolodovich of Chernigov by his unknown wife.

#2 (before 1189): an unknown woman, who was a priest's wife at that time

Vasilko Vladimirovich (?-1189)
Vladimir Vladimirovich (?-1189)

Ancestors

Footnotes

Sources
Dimnik, Martin: The Dynasty of Chernigov - 1146-1246; Cambridge University Press, 2003, Cambridge; .
Vernadsky, George: Kievan Russia; Yale University Press, 1948, New Haven and London; .

1190s deaths
Rurikids
Princes of Halych
Eastern Orthodox monarchs
Year of birth unknown
Rostislavichi family